R. Sivanandam is an Indian politician and incumbent Member of the Legislative Assembly of Tamil Nadu. He was elected to the Tamil Nadu legislative assembly from Arni constituency as a Dravida Munnetra Kazhagam candidate in 1996 and 2006 elections.

References 

Tamil Nadu MLAs 1996–2001
Dravida Munnetra Kazhagam politicians
Living people
Tamil Nadu MLAs 2006–2011
Year of birth missing (living people)